Mariza de Andrade is a Brazilian-American biostatistician who works as a professor of biostatistics at the Mayo Clinic, and is known for her work on statistical genetics and precision medicine.

Early life
De Andrade earned a bachelor's degree in mathematics from the Faculdade de Filosofia, Ciências e Letras de Ribeirão Preto in São Paulo and a master's degree in statistics at the Instituto Nacional de Matemática Pura e Aplicada in Rio de Janeiro. She moved to the University of Washington for additional graduate study, earning a second master's degree and Ph.D. in biostatistics there. Her 1990 dissertation, Estimation of the Genotypic Parameters under Non- Normal Models, was supervised by Elizabeth A. Thompson.

Career
She was a postdoctoral researcher at the University of Texas Health Science Center at Houston before joining the Mayo Clinic.

In 2004, de Andrade served as president of the Caucus for Women in Statistics. In 2017, the American Statistical Association listed her as one of their Fellows.

References

External links

Year of birth missing (living people)
Living people
American women statisticians
Brazilian statisticians
Biostatisticians
University of Washington alumni
Mayo Clinic people
Fellows of the American Statistical Association
21st-century American women